Nicholas R. Mann (born 1952) is the author of books on geomancy, mythology, the Celtic tradition, sacred geometry and, most recently, archaeoastronomy.  Glastonbury, England, Avebury, England, Sedona, Arizona (USA) and Washington, DC (USA) are all locations which feature in his work. His book Druid Magic: The Practice of Celtic Wisdom, co-written with Maya Sutton, PhD, has been described by the British Druid Order as"One of the best practical guides available..."  He is also an illustrator, producing the images for the Silver Branch Cards, a Celtic divination deck of his own design. He was born in Sussex, England. He lives in Somerset, England with his partner Philippa Glasson, with whom he co-authored The Star Temple of Avalon: Glastonbury's Ancient Observatory Revealed.

Bibliography

 Avalon’s Red and White Springs: The Healing Waters of Glastonbury with Dr. Philippa Glasson (2005) Green Magic
 The Dark God: A Personal Journey Through the Underworld (1996) Llewellyn Publications , 
 Druid Magic: The Practice of Celtic Wisdom with Maya Sutton, PhD (2001) Llewellyn , 
 Energy Secrets of Glastonbury Tor (2004) Green Magic
 The Giants of Gaia with Marcia Sutton, PhD (1995) Brotherhood of Life Books , 
 Glastonbury Tor: A Guide to the History and Legends (Pamphlet) (1993) Triskele Publications
 His Story: Masculinity in the Post-Patriarchal World  (1995) Llewellyn Publications , 
 The Isle of Avalon: Sacred Mysteries of Arthur and Glastonbury (2001) Green Magic , 
 The Keltic Power Symbols: Native Traditions, the Keltic Goddess and God - The Serpent, the Power Animals and the Pictish Symbol Stones (1987) Triskele
 The Cauldron and the Grail (1986) Triskele
 Reclaiming the Gods: Magic, Sex, Death and Football (2002) Green Magic , 
 The Sacred Geometry of Washington, D.C.: The Integrity and Power of the Original Design (2006) Green Magic , 
 Sedona: Sacred Earth: A Guide to Geomantic Applications in the Red Rock Country (1989) Zivah Pub , 
 Sedona: Sacred Earth - A Guide to the Red Rock Country (2005) Light Technology Publishing , 
 The Silver Branch Cards: Divination using Druid Celtic Symbolism & Mythology (2000) Druidways
 The Star Temple of Avalon: Glastonbury's Ancient Observatory Revealed with Philippa Glasson (2007) 
 Avebury Cosmos: The Neolithic World of Avebury henge,Silbury Hill, West Kennet long barrow,the Sanctuary & the Longstones Cove (2011) O-Books

Notes 

1952 births
English occult writers
Alumni of the University of London
Living people